DJO, Djo, or Djô may refer to:
Djô, Portuguese futsal player
DJO, manufacturer of medical devices
DJO High School or Bishop Denis J. O'Connell High School
Joe Keery or Djo, American actor and musician

People with the given name
Djô d'Eloy, Cape Verdean singer
Djo Issama Mpeko, footballer
Djo Tunda Wa Munga, film director